Prisilla Altagracia Rivera Brens (born December 29, 1984, in Santo Domingo) is a volleyball player from the Dominican Republic.

Career

2000-2001
Rivera debuted in 2000 at the Nacional District Superior Tournament with Los Prados, being elected Rookie of the Year. She played with the Girls National Team at the 2001 FIVB U18 World Championship in Pula, Croatia, helping her team to reach the 8th place. That year, she also played with the senior team at the 2001 NORCECA Championship winning with her team the bronze medal.

2003-2004
With her National Team, she won the gold medal at the 2003 Pan American Games.

She competed for her native country at the 2004 Summer Olympics in Athens, Greece, wearing the number #14 jersey. There she ended up in eleventh place with the Dominican Republic women's national team. Rivera played as a middle-blocker.

2005-2006
Playing in home soil Professional Tournament, Prisilla won the "Metropolitan League Championship" with her team Los Prados and awarded "Final Series Most Valuable Player". This year she was selected "Best Attacker" at the Salonpas Cup.

At the 2006 FIVB Grand Prix, Prisilla Altagracia helped her team to finish in the 8th place, not qualifying for the final round.

2007-2009
Won with her team Grupo Murcia 2002, the 2007 Supercup, her team also win the Superliga, and Queens Cup.

For the 2008/2009 season with Grupo 2002 Murcia won the "Most Valuable Player" award at the Spanish Supercopa won by her team and the same award, MVP at the 2008/2009 Superliga Championship and the 2008/2009 Queen's Cup.

2010
As the captain of her club, CAV Murcia 2005 she won her 11th title with this Spanish club, the 2010 Spanish Queen's Cup , defeating Universidad de Burgos in Monforte de Lemos, Lugo.

She won the Most Valuable Player and the gold medal with her National Team at the 2010 Pan-American Cup held in Rosarito and Tijuana, Mexico. She also won in Puerto Rico the Central American and Caribbean Games gold medal.

2011
Rivera won with CAV Murcia 2005 the 2011 Spanish Queen's Cup Championship, contributing with 25 points, winning her fifth consecutive Spanish Cup.

After being competing in Murcia since 2006, Rivera left CAV Murcia to join the Puerto Rican team Mets de Guaynabo, in late March 2011. Prisilla and her team finished the season as League Runner-Up, after being swept away in 4 matches by Criollas de Caguas.

With her national team, Rivera won the "Best Spiker" award and the silver medal at the 2011 Pan-American Cup.
Rivera signed with the Brazilian club Vôlei Bauru.

2012-
Rivera joined fellow Dominican Brenda Castillo and national team head coach Marcos Kwiek in the Brazilian  Super League club Concilig Vôlei Bauru for the 2016/17 season.

2018
Taking the 2017/18 season of the Turkish Second Division club Sarıyer Belediyesi, when this club changed their roster in early 2018 adding Rivera and Puerto Rican Áurea Cruz to recover from the club's sixth place at that time. Rivera was awarded Most Valuable Player and became league champion at the 2018 Dominican Republic Superior Volleyball League from the National District, playing with the team Caribeñas VC. At the 2018 Central American and Caribbean Games, Rivera won with her team the gold medal and the Most Valuable Player award. During the inaugural Nations League her national had a 3-12 mark ranking in the fourteenth place. Her team lost 2-3 in the final match of the Pan-American Cup, winning the silver medal. She was awarded the Best Libero, Best Digger and Best Receiver. Rivera played the World Championship in Japan, her team was 3-2 in the first round and had a 5-4 mark after the second round and finishing in the ninth place when they could not qualify for the third round.

2019
She was transferred to Guerreras VC for the 2019 Dominican Republic Superior Volleyball League season. In Peru, at the Pan-American Cup, her team finished in the tournament's second place, losing 0-3 to the United States. She took her second continental games golden medal when she won the Pan American Games gold medal. Later she played in Puerto Rico the NORCECA Championship, winning the gold medal by defeating 3-2 the United States.

2020
After the Olympic Qualification Tournament held in Santo Domingo, where her national team achieved the Olympic spot undefeated, Rivera traveled to Budapest, to join the Hungarian League club Újpest UTE. She was able to win with her team and claimed she loved the city, but that was a little cold for her. Just days later she was shocked with the news that her only daughter, Megan Prisilla Logroño Rivera had passed away and she had to travel back to Santo Domingo, ending her participation. It was then revealed by Cristóbal Marte, president of the National Project for Women's Volleyball Teams, that Rivera joined the Hungarian league late, losing wages from October to December in order to help her national team in the Olympic qualifier.

Together with other twelve women, Rivera was awarded with the Medal of Merit of the Dominican Woman in the context of the International Women's Day by the 98-20 president Danilo Medina decree. She later expressed that she would postpone her retirement because the COVID-19 restrictions forced the postponement of the 2020 Summer Olympics, that she has planned to stay connected to her sport when she leaves the court and how deeply her life have just changed overnight.

2021
Rivera played her last Nations League where her team performed greatly posting a 9–6 mark, valid for a sixth place rank. Rivera was set to retire after her participation in the Olympic tournament and she mas name flag bearer along with boxer Rodrigo Marte, and they both entered the Parade of Nations as part of the 64 Dominican representatives, dancing Merengue. Rivera's team lost 0–3 to Serbia, 2–3 to Brazil, 2–3 to South Korea, before finally winning 3–0 to Kenya and  3–1 to Japan, qualifying to the quarterfinals. But in the quarterfinals, they lost 0–3 to the United States to end their Olympic hopes and ranking eight with her team. She remarked that this result left everyone unsatisfied and it was the whole team responsibility.

In the NORCECA Championship she helped her national team to continental championship gold and qualification for the 2022 World Championship. She also secured the Best Outside Spiker award. The Dominican had a undefeated record during the Pan-American Cup winning their fifth tournmament gold medal to Mexico. As team captain, Rivera played the final match as her last one for her national team, having previously announced your retirement, she was called for substitution at the end of the third set, she came back and kissed the court as farewell and received a standing ovation being congratulated by both team players. After being awarded as Most Valuable Player and the Best Outside Hitter in the last of her 20 years service representing her country.

Cristo Rey was the third club from the Dominican Republic Superior Volleyball League from the National District that saw Rivera playing, when she was transferred for the 2021 season. She became league champion and awarded Most Valuable Player and Best Scorer. She then received recognitions from Gala Mazine, where she expressed that she was unsure if she have chosen volleyball or the game chose her; the city of Santo Domingo, that named her Meritorious Daughter; and the Senate of the Dominican Republic, where she was considered a reference for the younger generations and example of bravery and determination, recalling when she used sacrifice herself walking from her neighbourhood, Villa Consuelo to olympic complex, in order to achieve her dreams. The Dominican Republic Hall of Fame invited her to carry Hall's flag during the 2021 class ceremony.

She signed for the club Jakarta Pertamina Energi from the Indonesian Proliga for the 2022 season.

Clubs
  San Pedro (1998–2001)
  Los Prados (2000)
  Mirador (2002–2004)
  Los Prados (2005)
  Grupo 2002 Murcia (2006–2008)
  CAV Murcia 2005 (2008–2011)
  Mets de Guaynabo (2011)
  Igtisadchi Baku (2011–2012)
  Pinkin de Corozal (2013)
  Lokomotiv Baku (2013–2014)
  Bursa (2014–2015)
  Südtirol Neruda Bolzano (2015–2016)
  Concilig Vôlei Bauru (2016–2017)
  Sarıyer Belediyesi (2017–2018)
  Caribeñas VC (2018)
  Guerreras VC (2019)
  Újpest UTE (2020)
  Cristo Rey (2021)
  Jakarta Pertamina Energi (2022)
  Akari Power Chargers (2022)

Awards

Individuals
 2000 Nacional District Superior Tournament "Rookie of the Year"
 2005 Dominican Metropolitan League Final Series "Most Valuable Player"
 2005 Salonpas Cup "Best Attacker"
 2006/2007 Spanish Second Division "Most Valuable Player"
 2007/2008 Spanish Superliga Final Series "Most Valuable Player"
 2008/2009 Spanish Queens Cup "Most Valuable Player"
 2008/2009 Spanish Superliga Final Series "Most Valuable Player"
 2009 NORCECA Championship "Most Valuable Player"
 2009 Spanish Super Cup "Most Valuable Player"
 2009/2010 Spanish Queens Cup "Most Valuable Player"
 2010 Pan-American Cup "Most Valuable Player"
 2011 Pan-American Cup "Best Spiker"
 2018 Dominican Republic Superior Volleyball League "Most Valuable Player"
 2018 Central American and Caribbean Games "Most Valuable Player"
 2021 NORCECA Championship "Best Outside Hitter"
 2021 Pan-American Cup "Best Outside Hitter"
 2021 Pan-American Cup "Most Valuable Player"
 2021 Dominican Republic Superior Volleyball League "Most Valuable Player"
 2021 Dominican Republic Superior Volleyball League "Best Scorer"

Clubs
 2005 Dominican Metropolitan League –  Champion, with Los Prados
 2006 Spanish Supercup –  Champion, with Grupo 2002 Murcia
 2007 Spanish Supercup –  Champion, with Grupo 2002 Murcia
 2007 CEV Top Teams Cup –  Champion, with Grupo 2002 Murcia
 2007 Spanish Superliga –  Champion, with Grupo 2002 Murcia
 2007 Spanish Queen's Cup –  Champion, with Grupo 2002 Murcia
 2008 Spanish Superliga –  Champion, with Grupo 2002 Murcia
 2008 Spanish Queen's Cup –  Champion, with Murcia 2005
 2009 Spanish Superliga –  Champion, with Murcia 2005
 2009 Spanish Queen's Cup –  Champion, with Murcia 2005
 2009 Spanish Supercup –  Champion, with Murcia 2005
 2010 Spanish Queen's Cup –  Champion, with Murcia 2005
 2010 Spanish Supercup –  Champion, with Murcia 2005
 2011 Spanish Queen's Cup –  Champion, with Murcia 2005
 2011 Puerto Rican League –  Runner-Up, with Mets de Guaynabo
 2013 Puerto Rican League –  Runner-Up, with Pinkin de Corozal
 2014–15 CEV Challenge Cup –  Champions, with Bursa BBSK
 2018 Dominican Republic Superior Volleyball League –  Champion, with Caribeñas VC
 2021 Dominican Republic Superior Volleyball League –  Champion, with Cristo Rey

References

External links
 FIVB Profile
 CAV Murcia 2005
 CEV Profile

1984 births
Living people
Dominican Republic women's volleyball players
Dominican Republic expatriate sportspeople in Spain
Expatriate volleyball players in Spain
Volleyball players at the 2004 Summer Olympics
Volleyball players at the 2012 Summer Olympics
Olympic volleyball players of the Dominican Republic
Volleyball players at the 2003 Pan American Games
Volleyball players at the 2015 Pan American Games
Pan American Games gold medalists for the Dominican Republic
Pan American Games bronze medalists for the Dominican Republic
Sportspeople from Santo Domingo
Pan American Games medalists in volleyball
Central American and Caribbean Games gold medalists for the Dominican Republic
Competitors at the 2006 Central American and Caribbean Games
Competitors at the 2010 Central American and Caribbean Games
Competitors at the 2014 Central American and Caribbean Games
Outside hitters
Opposite hitters
Middle blockers
Expatriate volleyball players in the United States
Igtisadchi Baku volleyball players
Lokomotiv Baku volleyball players
Expatriate volleyball players in Turkey
Expatriate volleyball players in Italy
Expatriate volleyball players in Brazil
Bursa Büyükşehir Belediyespor athletes
Dominican Republic expatriate sportspeople in the United States
Dominican Republic expatriate sportspeople in Italy
Dominican Republic expatriate sportspeople in Brazil
Central American and Caribbean Games medalists in volleyball
Medalists at the 2015 Pan American Games
Volleyball players at the 2020 Summer Olympics
Expatriate volleyball players in Puerto Rico
Dominican Republic expatriate sportspeople in Turkey
Dominican Republic expatriate sportspeople in Azerbaijan
Expatriate volleyball players in Azerbaijan
Dominican Republic expatriate sportspeople in Puerto Rico
Expatriate volleyball players in Hungary
Expatriate volleyball players in the Philippines
Expatriate volleyball players in Indonesia
Dominican Republic expatriate sportspeople in the Philippines
Dominican Republic expatriate sportspeople in Hungary
Dominican Republic expatriate sportspeople in Indonesia